The Left Socialist Party - Socialist Party of Struggle (LSP-PSL) is a Belgian Trotskyist party, affiliated to International Socialist Alternative.  The party publishes monthly newspapers in Dutch and French, entitled Linkse Socialist and Lutte Socialiste, respectively.

Origins

The LSP-PSL was founded in 1992 as Militant Left (Militant Links), an offshoot from the Spark (Vonk) which operated as a Marxist tendency within the Belgian Socialist Party.  Following the Socialist Party’s swing to the right, discontent within the Spark culminated in a split, largely over the strategy of entryism under the changed circumstances.  One group continued as the Spark, working within the Socialist Party, whilst another left to form Militant Left, later renaming themselves the Left Socialist Party.  The LSP was at first active only in the cities of Ghent and Geraardsbergen, but has since grown into a national party.  In 1999 the party formally gained its francophone section, Movement for a Socialist Alternative, renamed Socialist Party of Struggle in 2009.

Electoral alliances

The LSP-PSL aims to build left unity around a common minimum programme, while maintaining the right of groups to organise and campaign on their own platforms.  To this end, the party has sought to engage with other radical left parties and has met with some success in creating electoral alliances with the Communist Party, Humanist Party and Revolutionary Communist League.  The LSP-PSL contested the 2007 federal elections as part of a new political movement, the Committee for Another Policy, though it subsequently left at the end of the year.  Later, it participated in the Left Front, with which it stood in the federal elections in 2010.
In the 2014 federal elections, the LSP/PSL did not participate, calling for a vote for the Workers' Party of Belgium or other small left parties instead, despite the PTB/PvdA having rejected the LSP-PSL's proposal for a common list.

Young people

The party emphasises youth work and in universities has a youth network named Active Left Students (EGA-ALS).  EGA-ALS takes up issues concerning education, but also campaigns on wider social issues such as sexism and racism, including forming organised opposition to the far-right Nationalist Student Association.  In 2010, along with trade union and leftwing youth groups Comac, Écolo j, Jeunes-FGTB and JOC,  the PSL launched Jeunes en Lutte pour l'Emploi to campaign on the issue of youth unemployment, taking as its inspiration the Youth Fight for Jobs campaign in Great Britain.

Election results

Federal Parliament
Chamber of Representatives

Senate

European Parliament

Communist parties in Belgium
Belgium
Trotskyist organizations in Europe
Political parties established in 1992
1992 establishments in Belgium